Nur eine Frau ("Only One Woman") is an East German film. It was released in 1958. It is based on the life of the Leipzig campaigner for women's rights, Louise Otto-Peters, who is portrayed in the film by Karla Runkehl.

References

External links
 

1958 films
East German films
1950s German-language films
Films directed by Carl Balhaus
1950s German films